Nils-Åke Sandell (5 February 1927 – 29 May 1992) was a Swedish football player and manager.

Club career 
Sandell started his playing career in his birth city Lund at local club Lunds BK. After a brief period at IFK Malmö he returned to Lund before moving to Malmö FF in the 1952 season. After spending 4 years in Malmö Sandell had quite a reputation for being a goalscorer and tried his luck in Italy and SPAL 1907. After his period in Italy Sandell returned to Malmö FF and played one last season there in 1958.

International career 
He played a crucial role in Sweden's triumph at the 1952–55 Nordic Football Championship, being the top goal scorer of the tournament with 10 goals in 8 caps, and he was also part of Sweden's squad for the football tournament at the 1952 Summer Olympics, but he did not play in any matches.

Managerial career 
After returning from Italy and playing for a couple of games during the 1958 season Sandell were asked to become manager of the club. He managed the club from 1959 to 1963 winning no titles. Sandells manager career continued throughout regional clubs in Skåne and finished his career at IFK Malmö, nearly managing to promote them to Allsvenskan in 1980.

Honours 
Sweden

 Summer Olympics bronze medal: 1952
 Nordic Football Championship: 1952–1955

Individual

 Nordic Football Championship top scorer: 1952–1955

References

Sources

1927 births
1992 deaths
Swedish footballers
Sweden international footballers
Olympic footballers of Sweden
Footballers at the 1952 Summer Olympics
Allsvenskan players
Serie A players
Malmö FF players
Lunds BK players
S.P.A.L. players
Swedish expatriate footballers
Expatriate footballers in Italy
Swedish football managers
Malmö FF managers
Association football forwards
Sportspeople from Lund